Bolehošť is a municipality and village in Rychnov nad Kněžnou District in the Hradec Králové Region of the Czech Republic. It has about 600 inhabitants.

Administrative parts
The villages of Bolehošťská Lhota and Lipiny are administrative parts of Bolehošť.

References

Villages in Rychnov nad Kněžnou District